Csaba Csáki is a theoretical physicist who studied under Lisa Randall at the MIT Center for Theoretical Physics. He is known for his work in models of extra dimensions and supersymmetry. He is currently a professor at Cornell University. He was granted fellowship by the American Physical Society in 2016.

References

External links
Faculty page at Cornell University

Theoretical physicists
Cornell University faculty
Living people
Fellows of the American Physical Society
Year of birth missing (living people)
MIT Center for Theoretical Physics alumni